Kruibeke is a municipality located in the Belgian province of East Flanders. The municipality comprises the towns of Bazel, Kruibeke proper and Rupelmonde. On 1 January 2018, Kruibeke had a total population of 16,657. The total area is 33.42 km².

The oldest secular centre of the area is the feudal castle of Wissekerke at Bazel, which was inhabited by the ancient family Vilain until 1989.

In March 2003, the mayor at that time Antoine Denert set up the Department of Tenderness to encourage residents to be nicer to each other. Denert worried that "people don't cuddle anymore and that's the reason why there are so many conflicts." and announced: "I will set an example and start in my own village by caressing, cuddling and kissing as many people as possible." He officially added Tenderness to his alderman portfolio of duties, until then Work, Environment and Budget. As of 26 August 2004, no other civic governments have adopted this idea.

Jos Stassen has been the active mayor since the 2013 elections. He leads a majority composed of SamenVoorKruibeke (sp.a, Groen! and Open VLD) and CD&V. Their combined efforts gave them a majority over the largest party, N-VA, led by former mayor Antoine Denert.

Famous inhabitants
Gerardus Mercator, cartographer

References

External links

Official website 
News item: Belgian mayor sets up Department of Tenderness 

Municipalities of East Flanders
Waasland
Populated places in East Flanders